Lowe is a surname. Notable persons with that name include:

 Aaron Lowe (born 1974), Canadian ice dancer
 Adolph Lowe (1893–1995), German sociologist and economist
 Al Lowe (born 1946), American computer game programmer
 Alan Lowe (born 1961), Canadian politician
 Alex Lowe (1958–1999), American mountaineer
 Alex Lowe (born 1968), English actor
 Alf Lowe, GC (born 1931), British sailor
 Alice Lowe (born 1977), English actress
 Andrea Lowe (born 1975), English actress
 Andrew Lowe (born 1959), Canadian scientist
 Ann Lowe (1898–1981), American fashion designer
 Annie Lowe (1834–1910), Australian suffragist
 Arthur Lowe (1915–1982), English actor
 Arvie Lowe Jr. (born 1978), American actor
 Ben Lowe (born 1985), Australian rugby League player
 Bernie Lowe (1917–1993), American music producer
 Bert Lowe (1912–1933), New Zealand boxer
 Bobby Lowe (1865–1951), American baseball player
 Brandon Lowe (born 1994), American baseball player
 Bull Lowe (1895–1939), American football player
 Caitlin Lowe (born 1985), American softball player
 Cass Lowe, British musician
 Catherine Lowe (born 1986), American graphic designer and reality television star
 Chad Lowe (born 1968), American actor
 Charles Lowe (1890–1953), English cricketer
 Charles P. Lowe, pioneer recording artist
 Charles Herbert Lowe (1920–2002), American biologist and herpetologist
 Chris Lowe (born 1949), British journalist
 Chris C. Lowe (born 1987), American basketball player
 Chris S. Lowe (born 1959), British musician with the Pet Shop Boys
 Craig Lowe (born 1957), American mayor of Gainesville, FL
 Crystal Lowe (born 1981), Canadian actress
 Cyril Lowe (1891–1983), British rugby player and flying ace
 Daisy Lowe (born 1989), English fashion model
 Daniel Lowe (born 1992), American sports shooter
 Darren Lowe (born 1960), Canadian ice hockey player
 Darren Lowe, American lacrosse player
 David Lowe (disambiguation)
 Derek Lowe (born 1973), American baseball player
 Doug Lowe (born 1942), Australian politician
 Douglas Lowe (disambiguation)
 Earl Lowe (born c. 1950), Jamaican musician
 Ed Lowe (businessman) (1920–1995), American inventor
 Ed Lowe (1946–2011), American journalist
 Eddie Lowe (1925–2009), English footballer
 Eddie Lowe (born 1960), American politician and player of Canadian football
 Edmund Lowe (1890–1971), American actor
 Edward Lowe (c. 1690 – c. 1724), English pirate
 Edward Clarke Lowe (1823–1912), English educator
 Edward Joseph Lowe (1825–1900), English botanist
 Edward T. Lowe Jr. (1880–1973), American film producer
 E.J. Lowe (1950–2014), English philosopher
 Emilio Lowe, a fictional archer in the anime Black Cat
 Emily Lowe (?–1882), British travel writer
 Enoch Louis Lowe (1820–1892), American politician
 Ernest Anthony Lowe (1928–2014), British economist
 Ethan Lowe (born 1991), Australian rugby league player
 Florence Leontine Lowe (1901–1975), American aviator
 Sir Francis Lowe, 1st Baronet (1852–1929), British politician
 Frank Lowe (1943–2003), American musician
 Frank Lowe (born 1941), British businessman
 Fred Lowe (born 1947), American weightlifter
 Gary Lowe (1934–2017), American football player
 Gavin Lowe, American computer scientist
 George Lowe (disambiguation)
 Georgina Lowe, British television producer
 Gerry Lowe (1927–2018), English rugby union and rugby league footballer
 Sir Gordon Lowe (1884–1972), British tennis player
 Greg Lowe, American mountain climber
 Gregg Lowe (born 1986), British actor
 Graham Lowe (born 1946), New Zealand rugby league football coach
 H. F. Lowe, English cricketer
 Hannah Lowe (born 1976), British writer
 Harold Lowe (1882–1944), fifth officer on the RMS Titanic
 Harry Lowe (1886–1958), English footballer
 Harry James Lowe, Jr. (1922–1942), American sailor
 Sir Hudson Lowe (1769–1844), Anglo-Irish military officer and Governor of St Helena
 Ian Lowe (born 1942), Australian scientist
 Jack Lowe, Sr. (1913–1980), American businessman
 Jack Lowe, Jr. (born 1939), American businessman
 Jaiman Lowe (born 1980), Australian rugby player
 Jamal Lowe (born 1994), Jamaican footballer
 James Lowe (disambiguation)
 Janet Lowe (1940–2019), American writer
 Jason Lowe (disambiguation)
 Jean Lowe (born 1960), American artist
 Jeff Lowe (1950–2018), American alpinist
 Jemma Lowe (born 1990), British swimmer
 Jesse Lowe (1814–1868), American politician
 Jet Lowe (born 1946), American photographer
 Jez Lowe (born 1955), British musician
 Jim Lowe (1923–2016), American musician
 Bl. John Lowe (1553–1586), English priest and martyr
 John Lowe (1899–1960), Canadian priest
 John Lowe (1912–1995), British footballer
 John Lowe (born 1945), British darts player
 John Charles Lowe (born 1942), British musician
 Jonathan Lowe (1950–2014), British philosopher
 Joseph Lowe (1845–1899), American saloon keeper
 Josh Lowe (born 1998), American baseball player
 Karl Lowe (born 1984), New Zealand rugby union player
 Kate Lowe (born 1975), English cricketer
 Keegan Lowe (born 1993), American Canadian hockey player
 Keith Lowe (born 1985), English footballer
 Kendra Lowe (born 1962), English netball player
 Kenneth Gordon Lowe (1917–2010), Scottish physician
 Kenny Lowe (born 1961), English footballer
 Kevin Lowe (born 1959), Canadian hockey player
 Lisa Lowe, American academic
 Mark Lowe (born 1983), American baseball player
 Martha Perry Lowe (1829–1902), American poet, activist
 Mary Johnson Lowe (1924–1999), American judge
 Max Lowe (born 1997), English footballer
 Megan Lowe (1915–2017), English cricketer
 Ming C. Lowe (born 1945), American artist
 Mundell Lowe (1922–2017), American jazz guitarist
 Muriel Lowe (1914–1966), English cricketer
 Nate Lowe (born 1995), American baseball player
 Neil Lowe (born 1978), English rugby player
 Nick A. Lowe (born 1979), American comic book editor
 Nick D. Lowe (born 1949), British singer
 Omare Lowe (born 1978), American football player
 Onandi Lowe (born 1974), Jamaican soccer player
 Paddy Lowe (born 1962), British racing engineer
 Paul Lowe (born 1936), American football player
 Pearl Lowe (born 1970), British musician
 Percy Lowe (1870–1948), English surgeon and ornithologist
 Peter Lowe (disambiguation)
 Phil Lowe (born 1950), English rugby league footballer
 Philip Lowe (born 1961), Australian economist
 Rachel Lowe (born 1977), British entrepreneur
 Rachel Lowe (born 2000), Australian soccer player
 Ralph P. Lowe (1805–1883), American politician
 Rebecca Lowe (born 1980), British journalist
 Richard Barrett Lowe (1902–1972), Governor of American Samoa and Guam
 Richard Thomas Lowe (1802–1874) British naturalist
 Rob Lowe (born 1964), American actor
 Robert Lowe, American singer
 Robert Lowe, 1st Viscount Sherbrooke (1811–1892), British statesman
 Robson Lowe (1905–1997), British philatelist
 Rosemary Lowe (1921–2014),  English ichthyologist, ecologist, and limnologist 
 Rosie Lowe (born 1989), English musician
 Ross Lowe (1928–1955), Canadian hockey player
 Rupert Lowe (born 1957), British businessman
 Ruth Lowe (1914–1981), Canadian musician
 Ryan Lowe (born 1978), English footballer
 Sam Lowe (1867–1947), English cricketer
 Sammy Lowe (1918–1993), American musician
 Sean Lowe (disambiguation)
 Sid Lowe (born 1976), British journalist
 Sidney Lowe (born 1960), American basketball coach
 Simon Lowe (born 1973), British actor
 Sophie Lowe (born 1990), English-born Australian actress
 Stephen Lowe (disambiguation) 
 Steven Lowe, British writer
 Susan Lowe (born 1948), American actress
 Ted Lowe (1920–2011), British snooker commentator
 Thaddeus S. C. Lowe (1832–1913), American aeronaut, scientist and inventor
 Thomas Lowe (Lord Mayor) (d. 1623), English politician
 Thomas Lowe (politician) (1812–1875), American politician
 Thomas Lowe (tenor) (c.1719–1783), English singer
 Tiffany Anastasia Lowe (born 1972), daughter of musician Carlene Carter
 Titus Lowe (1877–1959), English-American clergyman
 Todd Lowe (born 1977), American actor
 Tom Lowe, American writer
 Tom E. Lowe (born 1975), British disc jockey
 Tom P. Lowe (born 1973), British singer
 Trent Lowe (born 1984), Australian cyclist
 Vaughan Lowe (born 1952), British lawyer
 Vederian Low (born 1999), American football player
 W. H. M. Lowe (1861–1944), British army officer
 William C. Lowe (1941–2013), American engineer and businessman
 William M. Lowe (1842–1882), American politician
 William W. Lowe (1873–1945), English cricketer
 Woodrow Lowe (born 1954), American football player
 Zane Lowe (born 1973), New Zealand disc jockey

See also 
 Lau (surname)
 Low (surname)
 Löw (disambiguation)
 Lowe
 Loewe (surname)
 Lowes (disambiguation)
 Louw
 Liu (surname)

English-language surnames
German-language surnames
Surnames of English origin
Jewish surnames